Konsmo is a former municipality that was located in the old Vest-Agder county in Norway. The  municipality existed from 1911 until its dissolution in 1964. The administrative centre of the municipality was the village of Konsmo where Konsmo Church is located. The municipality was located in what is now the municipality of Lyngdal in Agder county.

History
The municipality of Konsmo was established on 1 January 1911 when the old municipality of Nord-Audnedal was divided into Konsmo (population: 782) and Vigmostad (population: 923). There were many municipal mergers across Norway during the 1960s due to the work of the Schei Committee. On 1 January 1964, Konsmo municipality was merged with the neighboring municipality of Grindheim and the Ågedal and Midtbø areas from Bjelland municipality to create the new municipality of Audnedal. Before the merger Konsmo had a population of 712.

Name
The municipality (originally the parish) is named after the old Konsmo farm, since the first Konsmo Church was built there.  The name is a corruption of Kongsmoen which means King's moor.

Government
All municipalities in Norway, including Konsmo, are responsible for primary education (through 10th grade), outpatient health services, senior citizen services, unemployment and other social services, zoning, economic development, and municipal roads.  The municipality was governed by a municipal council of elected representatives, which in turn elected a mayor.

Municipal council
The municipal council  of Konsmo was made up of representatives that were elected to four year terms.  The party breakdown of the final municipal council was as follows:

See also
List of former municipalities of Norway

References

Lyngdal
Former municipalities of Norway
1911 establishments in Norway
1964 disestablishments in Norway